Battle Arena Toshinden 3 for PlayStation is a 3D weapons-based fighting game and sequel of Battle Arena Toshinden 2. Toshinden 3 is the first of the main series not to be ported to other platforms. It is also the only game in the series that has game play differences between the Japanese version and subsequent U.S. and European releases.

Gameplay
Whereas Toshinden 2 was largely built upon the first game, Toshinden 3 radically changes the series' gameplay. The arenas are now enclosed, allowing players to launch opponents into the walls and ceilings in order to juggle them with further attacks. The combo system has also been reworked, with every character possessing a preset list of combos. As well as the 14 starting fighters, the game also adds 18 unlockable fighters bringing the total to 32, though most of them are largely mirror images of the original 14's fighting styles.

Toshinden 3'''s Arcade Mode is much different from the previous two. The opponents that the player faces depend on their selected character. If the player chooses one of the 14 starting fighters or "Heroes", then the computer-controlled opponents will eventually be Organization members while choosing an Organization member will have the player facing off against the "Heroes" themselves. Nagisa and Vermilion serve as the first bosses to their opponents' sides while the specific playing character's sub-boss soon appears next. After that, Sho arrives as the third boss (doubling as the final boss for any Organization member) and once he's defeated, the player will then face off against the Organization leader Abel, who serves as the normal final boss of the game. The former leader of the Organization whom Abel imprisoned, Veil, then later Kayin Amoh’s adoptive daughter, Naru can be fought after defeating Abel within the hardest difficulty levels of the game.

The U.S. and European releases of Toshinden 3 feature several game play differences from the original Japanese release including:
 Blocking high or low is automatic; pressing back blocks both block high and low attacks. In the Japanese version one had to press back and down to block low attacks.
 When hit by a reversal attack, all characters fly the full length of the arena. In the Japanese version, A.I. opponents fly the full length of the arena, but how far the player character flies is determined by his or her weight.
 Practice and Survival modes were added.
 A bug regarding the direction a character flies when hit by attacks that send them flying across the arena, when they were facing away from their attacker, was fixed.
 The forward distance a character moves while being hurt from Vermillion's over drive was decreased to match the backward distance, to prevent them from slowly moving toward Vermillion during the move.

Plot
With the Secret Society, the sponsors of the two previous Battle Arena Toshinden tournaments, finally defeated, it would soon transpire and be known that the Secret Society's long-time rival criminal group, the Organization, who have been observing both tournaments from the shadows, are now ready and prepared to make their own move in having to bring forth the destructive fighting god, Agon Teos, into the world.

The Organization's leader, Abel, requires the sacrificial blood of the world's strongest warriors and through the knowledge of his loyal agent, Vermilion, Abel organizes and sponsors a third Battle Arena Toshinden tournament in order to lure Eiji Shinjo and his fellow Toshinden fighters out in the open while pitting them against his own chosen warriors, who have copied and learned their specific targets' respective fighting styles. Furthermore, Abel targets a young English boy named David as he seeks to use him as a potential human vessel for Agon Teos. Managing to escape from the relentless pursuit of the Organization, David is soon saved and rescued by a young Japanese female gambler named Shizuku Fuji and in due time, both David and Shizuku enter the tournament in order to help aid Eiji and the rest of the Toshinden fighters against the Organization.

Eiji and the Toshinden fighters progress through the tournament and defeat their chosen rivals, during which a few storyline developments occur and happen from within the competition, such as Organization members Atahua and Tau forfeiting their matches to both Ellis and Gaia (with Atahua learning and understanding from Tau that the murder of a fighter couldn't justify the means of restoring an ancient empire), Tracy sparing the life of her vengeful older twin sister Rachael, who had refused Tracy's offer of starting over with her and walking away from her to never be seen again, and Organization member Cuiling switching sides in order to help Eiji and the rest of the Toshinden fighters out after killing Bayhou and avenging Fo Fai's past death while also realizing that Abel had to be stopped before he could succeed in bringing Agon Teos to the world. Eiji comes face-to-face once again with Vermilion and overcomes the assassin before finally encountering his long-lost older brother, Sho. The two battle and Eiji wins, with Sho complimenting his brother's skills before leaving. Eiji soon faces and slays Abel in single combat, but at the same time, accidentally frees the Organization's previous leader, Veil, who was betrayed and usurped by Abel long ago. Robbed of his revenge, Veil battles Eiji but is also killed as well.

With the deaths of both Veil and Abel, the Organization is completely destroyed and the world is miraculously saved from the malevolent wrath of Agon Teos. However, Eiji soon discovers that Vermilion had somehow survived and escaped the Organization's destruction while completely disappearing without a trace. Faced with an enticing offer, Eiji starts his own plan in order to lure Vermilion out for a final battle.

Reception

Jeff Gerstmann, reviewing the game for GameSpot, commented that whereas Toshinden 2 was a simple graphical upgrade which retained the flaws of the original game, Toshinden 3 genuinely advanced the series. He cited the single-round combat, super moves, enclosed arenas, and character unlocking, and concluded, "If you were one of the many who thought Toshinden was neat, but far too dull, this game may have what it takes to turn your viewpoint around." In contrast, Sushi-X of Electronic Gaming Monthly saw Battle Arena Toshinden 3 as a rush-job, noting how quickly it had come out after Toshinden 2. While he agreed that the character unlocking is a good feature, he argued that the enclosed arenas in effect sacrificed the strategic element of ring-outs for the lesser trade-off of improved frame rate. He and his three co-reviewers all commented that the game is flashy but shallow, with unbalanced characters and overly easy-to-execute super moves. Scary Larry of GamePro gave Battle Arena Toshinden 3 a score of 3.5 out of 5 within all four categories (control, sound, graphics, and fun factor), stating that while the game was better than Toshinden 2, "it's still not good enough to be classed with Tekken, Virtua Fighter 2, or even Tobal No. 1." His critiques included the game's simple gameplay, one-button special moves, slowdown which affected the game's continuity, and that "the fighters, although unique in appearance, are too similar in their fighting styles." He concluded that Toshinden 3'' wasn't a bad game, but couldn't compete with the other fighting games available for the PlayStation.

References

External links
Tamsoft page: BAT3

1996 video games
3D fighting games
Battle Arena Toshinden
Multiplayer video games
PlayStation (console) games
PlayStation 3 games
PlayStation Portable games
PlayStation Vita games
Takara video games
Video game sequels
Video games developed in Japan